San Michele Visdomini is a Roman Catholic church in the centre of Florence, central Italy. The original church of San Michele was demolished in 1368 to make space for the tribunes of the new Cathedral of Florence. Soon it was rebuilt in its present location to a design by Giovanni di Lapo Ghini, with later facade (1577-1590) by Bartolomeo Ammannati. A chapel for Francesco Pucci houses a Holy Family and Saints by Jacopo Pontormo.

The name Visdomini derives from the simplification of a title of an administrator in an episcopal office (a "vice domino").

References

 

Roman Catholic churches completed in 1590
Renaissance architecture in Florence
16th-century Roman Catholic church buildings in Italy
Michele Visdomini